Ikwuano is a Local Government Area of Abia State, Nigeria. Its headquarters is in Isiala Oboro. The name 'Ikwuano' etymologically indicates that there are four different ancient kingdoms that make up the community called Ikwuano. These include Oboro, Ibere, Ariam/Usaka and Oloko.

The postal code of the area is 440. It is one of the five LGAs that make up the Abia Central Senatorial District. As at 2022, the executive chairman is Stephen Mpamugo. Samuel Onuigbo currently serves as the Federal Representative representing Ikwuano/Umuahia North and South Federal Constituency at the House of Representatives. The member representing Ikwuano State Constituency at the Abia State House of Assembly is Stanley Nwabuisi.

History 
The present Ikwuano Local Government Area was part of the Bende Division in the then Southern Province created by the British Colonial Government as part of their “Divide and Rule” system of government and administration towards the beginning of the 19th Century. This was as early as the time Calabar was the capital of Nigeria.

When the Southern province was further divided, Ikwuano still remained part of the Bende Division. The present Bende town was the administrative headquarters where the District Commissioner resided. The District Commissioner, Nwa D.C., as he was known and called held courts at Bende and Oloko. At this time what was later carved out as Aba Division was part of the Bende Division, under the jurisdiction of Nwa D. C. The present Umuahia township later replaced Bende as the administrative headquarters after the extension of the Nigerian rail line from Port-Harcourt to Enugu between 1915 and 1916.

Ikwuano LGA was among the new local government areas that were created on 27 August 1991 when the General Ibrahim Babangida's Administration created Abia State from the old Imo State. It was carved out of the defunct Ikwuano-Umuahia of the Old Imo State.

Culture 
Ikwuano is known for cultures and arts which include Ekpe, New Yam (Iri-Ji) and Afo Amaghi Onuma festivals. Their cultural dances are Eketensi ritual dance, Oro, Ikperikpeogu (War Dance) Uko and so on. They also have Oba and Ekpe societies. The predominant languages spoken in Ikwuano are Igbo and English languages. Ikwuano brides are known to have some of the costliest bride prices in Igboland. Traditional marriages are held in high esteem.

Geography 
It has an area of 281 km. It lies between the latitudes 5 24lN and 5 30lN and between the longitudes of 7 32lE and 7 37lE.

It borders Umuahia North and Bende to its north, Umuahia South and Isiala- Ngwa North to its west, Ini to the east and Obot-Akara to the south.

Demographics 
The population of Ikwuano during the 2006 census was 137,993. As at 2015, it increased to 175,078. The area is inhabited primarily by the Igbo people.

Climate 
It experiences an average weather temperature of 28°C. The area witnesses two distinct seasons which are the rainy and dry seasons. The average humidity level is put at 62%.

Ikwuano LGA in the humid forest zone of Nigeria. The LGA has an average rainfall of 2351 mm, average minimum diurnal temperature of 22.90C and relative humidity range between 80-90%.

Economy & Agriculture 
The vegetation of the area is predominantly lowland rainforest, which makes it suitable for growing yam, cassava, maize, cashew and ginger. This has led to the area becoming the food basket of Abia State.

Farming is one of the key economic activities of the Ikwuano people. The area also hosts a number of markets where a variety of commodities are bought and sold. They include Ahia Ndoro and the Ariam Market. In fact, Ikwuano is situated in the palm belt of Eastern Nigeria. Other important economic engagements of the Ikwuano people are hunting, craftsmanship and wood carving.

Villages grouped according to clans 
The four clans of Ikwuano have a total of 56 villages. They are listed as follows:

Autonomous communities
Villages in Ikwuano are constitutionally placed under 42 autonomous communities, each autonomous community is led by an Eze. These communities are:
 Abaa Ukwu
 Afa
 Afa Ukwu
 Agbalu Ozu
 Agbo Ibere
 Agumba
 Ahaba Ukwu
 Ahuwa Ukwu
 Ajata Na Igu
 Ala-Ala Oboro
 Amanchai
 Amaoba Ime
 Ariam Ala-Ala
 Ariam Osoigwe
 Awom Na Ebo
 Awom Na Uzie
 Awom Oboro
 Awom Ukwu
 Ekpiri Elu-Elu
 Ekpiri Osaoji
 Ibere Ancient Kingdom
 Ibeuzo Ukwu
 Ikemba
 Ikputu
 Isiala Ahaba
 Isiama
 Ntalakwu
 Obi Ibere
 Obuohia Okike
 Okwe Ukwu
 Oro Ibere
 Oru Oboro
 Oruigwe
 Otu-Uzo
 Ugwuegbu
 Ugwu Ibere
 Uha-la-Uda
 Umuakoo
 Umuokeigbo
 Umudike
 Umudike Ukwu
 Usaka Ukwu

Educational Institutions 
 Michael Okpara University of Agriculture, Umudike
 National Root Crops Research Institute, Umudike
 Oboro Secondary School, Ikwuano
 Ikwuano Secondary School, Ariam
 Ibere Comprehensive Senior Secondary School, Ahia Orie, Ibere
 Wesley Seminary, Ndoro Oboro

Notable people 
 Ashley Nwosu (late), Nollywood actor
 Buchi Atuonwu, Nigerian reggae gospel artiste
 Adanma Okpara (late), wife of the first Premier of the defunct Eastern Region of Nigeria; Michael Okpara
 Kenneth Omeruo, Nigerian footballer
 Pascal Atuma, Canadian-Nigerian actor, screenwriter, film producer, director, comedian and CEO/Chairman of TABIC
 Oscar Atuma, Canadian-Nigerian actor and film producer
 Frank Dallas (late), Nollywood actor
 Samson Omeruah (late), former Governor of Anambra State
 Jimmy Johnson (late), Nollywood actor
 Henry Ikoh, Nigerian politician
Ogbonnaya Oji (late), ex-Biafran commander
 Chigul, Nigerian comedienne and actress
 Emeka Okoro, Nollywood actor and gospel artiste
 Ccioma, Nigerian gospel artiste and songwriter
 CJ Ujah, British athlete
Paul Omeruo, former military administrator of Kogi State
 Augustine Ukattah, Nigerian politician
 Monday Ubani, ex-NBA vice president
 Onyinyechi Ironkwe, former Miss Niger Delta 2015/16

See also 
 List of villages in Abia State

References 

Local Government Areas in Abia State
Populated places in Abia State
Local Government Areas in Igboland